The discography of Drowning Pool, an American rock band, consists of seven studio albums, one live album, one video album, one extended play, twenty singles and fifteen music videos.

Albums

Studio albums

Live albums

Video albums

Extended plays

Singles

Music videos

Guest appearances

References

External links
Official website 
Drowning Pool at AllMusic

Discography
Discographies of American artists
Heavy metal group discographies